Jalynn H. Bennett,  (12 March 1943 – 23 January 2015) was a Canadian consultant and corporate director.

Over the course of her career, she was a member of the Board of Directors of Canadian Imperial Bank of Commerce, Nortel Networks, Teck Cominco, Sears Canada, Cadillac Fairview, Bombardier, Rexel Canada Electrical, CanWest Global Communications Corporation, Ontario Power Generation, Ontario Teachers' Pension Plan, Canada Millennium Scholarship Foundation, the Ontario government's Public Accountants Council, and the Hospital for Sick Children Foundation.

Biography
Born in Toronto, Ontario, she attended Wellesley College from 1962 to 1963, before receiving a Bachelor of Arts degree in Economics from University of Trinity College in 1965.

She joined the Manufacturers Life Insurance Company eventually becoming the Vice President of Corporate Development from 1985 to 1989. In 1989, she founded her own consulting firm called Jalynn H. Bennett and Associates Limited which specializes in strategic planning and organizational development.

From 1989 to 1994, she was a Director of the Bank of Canada. From 1989 to 1994, she was a Commissioner of the Ontario Securities Commission. From 1994 to 1999, she was the Chair of the Trent University Board of Governors.

In 2000, she was made a Member of the Order of Canada for her "impressive financial career". In 1999, she was made a Fellow of the Institute of Corporate Directors. In 2004, she was awarded an honorary degree from University of Trinity College.

References

Sources
 
 
 
 

1943 births
2015 deaths
Businesspeople from Toronto
Directors of the Canadian Imperial Bank of Commerce
Members of the Order of Canada
Trinity College (Canada) alumni
Wellesley College alumni
Canadian women in business
Canadian corporate directors
Directors of Nortel
Canadian telecommunications industry businesspeople
Women corporate directors
Technology corporate directors

id:Jalynn Bennett
min:Jalynn Bennett
su:Jalynn Bennett